Area is a type of township-level divisions of China that is only used within Beijing. It is an intermediate designation between the rural township or town and the more urban subdistrict, and is given to settlements resembling desakotas.

Usually, each area within Beijing will also carry its previous respective designation as a town or township, and the town/township government will take additional role as the area office. Such a system is referred to as "One agency, two nameplates". For the most part, the area and town/township will share the same place name, such as Nanmofang and Liangxiang. However, there are also exceptions, such as the town name of Wanliu Area being Haidian.

History 
Area as a township-level divisions was first implemented inside Chaoyang Districts, with the creation of 4 areas in 1993. Below is a table listing the creation dates of all areas:

List of all current areas 
As of 2021, these are a total of 56 areas within Beijing. They are listed as follows:

Chaoyang District 

 Nanmofang Area/Nanmofang Township (南磨房地区/南磨房乡)
 Gaobeidian Area/Gaobeidian Township (高碑店地区/高碑店乡)
 Jiangtai Area/Jiangtai Township (将台地区/将台乡)
 Taiyanggong Area/Taiyanggong Township (太阳宫地区/太阳宫乡)
 Xiaohongmen Area/Xiaohongmen Township (小红门地区/小红门乡)
 Shibalidian Area/Shibalidian Township (十八里店地区/十八里店乡)
 Pingfang Area/Pingfang Township (平房地区/平房乡)
 Dongfeng Area/Dongfeng Township (东风地区/东风乡)
 Laiguangying Area/Laiguangying Township (来广营地区/来广营乡)
 Changying Area/Changying Township (常营地区/常营乡)
 Sanjianfang Area/Sanjianfang Township (三间房地区/三间房乡)
 Guanzhuang Area/Guanzhuang Township (管庄地区/管庄乡)
 Jinzhan Area/Jinzhan Township (金盏地区/金盏乡)
 Sunhe Area/Sunhe Township (孙河地区/孙河乡)
 Cuigezhuang Area/Cuigezhuang Township (崔各庄地区/崔各庄乡)
 Dongba Area/Dongba Township (东坝地区/东坝乡)
 Heizhuanghu Area/Heizhuanghu Township (黑庄户地区/黑庄户乡)
 Dougehuang Area/Dougezhuang Township (豆各庄地区/豆各庄乡)
 Wangsiying Area/Wangsiying Township (王四营地区/王四营乡)

Haidian District 

 Wanliu Area/Haidian Town (万柳地区/海淀镇)
 Dongsheng Area/Dongsheng Town (东升地区/东升镇)
 Wenquan Area/Wenquan Town (温泉地区/温泉镇)
 Sijiqing Area/Sijiqing Town (四季青地区/四季青镇)
 Xibeiwang Area/Xibeiwang Town (西北旺地区/西北旺镇)
 Sujiatuo Area/Sujiatuo Town (苏家坨地区/苏家坨镇)
 Shangzhuang Area/Shangzhuang Town (上庄地区/上庄镇)

Mentougou District 

 Wangping Area/Wangping Town (王平地区/王平镇)
 Yongding Area/Yongding Town (永定地区/永定镇)
 Longquan Area/Longquan Town (龙泉地区/龙泉镇)

Fangshan District 

 Liangxiang Area/Liangxiang Town (良乡地区/良乡镇)
 Zhoukoudian Area/Zhoukoudian Town (周口店地区/周口店镇)
 Liulihe Area/Liulihe Town (琉璃河地区/琉璃河镇)

Shunyi District 

 Renhe Area/Renhe Town (仁和地区/仁和镇)
 Houshayu Area/Houshayu Town (后沙峪地区/后沙峪镇)
 Tianzhu Area/Tianzhu Town (天竺地区/天竺镇)
 Yangzhen Area/Yang Town (杨镇地区/杨镇) 
 Niulanshan Area/Niulanshan Town (牛栏山地区/牛栏山镇)
 Nanfaxin Area/Nanfaxin Town (南法信地区/南法信镇)
 Mapo Area/Mapo Town (马坡地区/马坡镇)

Changping District 

 Nankou Area/Nankou Town (南口地区/南口镇)
 Machikou Area/Machikou Town (马池口地区/马池口镇)
 Shahe Area/Shahe Town (沙河地区/沙河镇)
 Dongxiaokou Area/Dongxiaokou Town (东小口地区/东小口镇)

Daxing District 

 Yizhuang Area/Yizhuang Town (亦庄地区/亦庄镇)
 Huangcun Area/Huangcun Town (黄村地区/黄村镇)
 Jiugong Area/Jiugong Town (旧宫地区/旧宫镇)
 Xihongmen Area/Xihongmen Town (西红门地区/西红门镇)
 Yinghai Area/Yinghai Town (瀛海地区/瀛海镇)

Huairou District 

 Huairou Area/Huairou Town (怀柔地区/怀柔镇)
 Yanqi Area/Yanqi Town (雁栖地区/雁栖镇)
 Miaocheng Area/Miaocheng Town (庙城地区/庙城镇)

Pinggu District 

 Yuyang Area/Pinggu Town (渔阳地区/平谷镇)
 Yukou Area/Yukou Town (峪口地区/峪口镇)
 Mafang Area/Mafang Town (马坊地区/马坊镇)
 Jinhaihu Area/Jinhaihu Town (金海湖地区/金海湖镇)

Miyun District 

 Tanying Area/Tanying Manchu and Mongolian Ethnic Township (檀营地区/檀营满族蒙古族乡)

References 

Township-level divisions of China
Administrative divisions of China